La Cumbre is a small town in the province of Córdoba, Argentina, in a valley known as the "Valle de Punilla". It has a population of 7800 inhabitants.

History
Initially La Cumbre was part of a community of farms and began to flourish as a town by the time the railway was built in the 1890s. As it was the highest point of the railway, it was given the name "La Cumbre" (The Summit) and the British railway locomotive engineers that participated were the first of an important presence of Anglo-Argentines that would become part of the town's culture even to this day. Unfortunately the railway now no longer runs and the old railway station has become the community centre, housing a small museum and tourist information office. The climate is moderate and particularly suited to people with bronchial and asthmatic problems.

During the 1920s British families built their holiday homes here, which contributed to the particularly English architectural style of La Cumbre. In 1924 the Golf Club was founded and is one of La Cumbre's features. For many years there were several English speaking boarding schools in the area, St Marys for girls which was adjacent to the Golf course has now become an old peoples home. Further afield, Reydon [Originally a hotel built by immigrants (Runnacles) from the town of Reydon in Suffolk, England in 1922, became a girls school] y another girls school which has now become a hotel is located at about 3[2] kilometres North of La Cumbre in the settlement of [Cruz Chica]. Beyond that a further couple of kilometres [on,] is the [largest school in the town (340 pupils][with an English-Spanish bi-lingual curricula] [St. Paul's] which operates today[,] but no longer taking in boarders and now accepting both boys and girls.

Today

Today La Cumbre has a low population for most of the year except for the summer holiday months, especially January and February when tourists visit the town to enjoy the many outdoor attractions, including paragliding, horse riding, fishing, hiking, river swimming, golf, and other enjoyments.

La Cumbre is also part of the Argentine Rally stage of the World Rally Championship.  The local statue of Christ the Redeemer was sculpted by Italian-Argentine artist Luis Ramacciotti.

Populated places in Córdoba Province, Argentina
Rally Argentina
Argentina
Córdoba Province, Argentina
Cities in Argentina